Serra de Vallivana or Muntanyes de Vallivana is an over  long mountain range straddling the Alt Maestrat and Baix Maestrat comarcas, Valencian Community, Spain.

Geography
The highest point of the range is the 1,275 m high Muixacre, located close to the Port de Querol mountain pass in the N-232 road. Other important peaks are Montserrat and Talaió. These mountains are frequently covered in snow in the winter.

This mountain chain rises between the almost abandoned village of Vallivana and the top of the Maestrat mountains, south of the Serra del Turmell and west of the Serra de l'Espadella ranges. 
These mountains are named after the virgin of Vallivana, the patroness of Morella. The easiest route to reach the range is from Vallivana or from Morella

Ecology
This sparsely-populated mountain area has the most important forested zone of the region with large prey birds such as the griffon vulture and wild animals like Spanish ibex, roe deer and wild boar.

The area of this range together with the neighboring Tinença de Benifassà and Serra del Turmell was declared a Site of Community Importance by the European Union under the name Tinença de Benifassà, Turmell i Vallivana.

See also
Mountains of the Valencian Community
Vallivana
Maestrat/Maestrazgo
List of Sites of Community Importance in Spain

References

External links

El País Valencià poble a poble; comarca a comarca - El Baix Maestrat
Dena de Coll i Moll - Llogaret de Vallivana
Els Ports : Vallivana – Vereda del Turmell - Vallivana

Vallivana
Vallivana
Alt Maestrat
Baix Maestrat